This is a list of church buildings dedicated to Olaf II of Norway:

List

See also
 St. Olaf's Church (disambiguation)
 St. Olave's Church (disambiguation)

St. Olav
Olaf II of Norway
 List